Fat Dog Mendoza is an animated television series produced by Sunbow Entertainment, Sony Wonder Television and TMO-Loonland loosely based on a Dark Horse one-off comic book of the same name. It is the first Cartoon Network Europe co-production and originally premiered on Cartoon Network UK on February 28, 2000.

Premise
The show centers a smart-mouthed dog who is incredibly obese, so much to the point that he is ball-shaped with small, stubby legs. Other characters include Little Costumed Buddy, Piranha Mae, and Onion Boy. The group try to fight crime in the fictional neighbourhood "Neighbourhood X" and they try to find for justice but often fail humorously.

Main characters
 Fat Dog Mendoza (Voiced by Mark Acheson) – The main protagonist. He is a massively obese dog who is smart, and willing to solve problems with Buddy.
 Little Costumed Buddy (voiced by Kathleen Barr) – Fat Dog's best friend who is a young boy. He loves pretending to be a hero but would wish to be a real one someday. In one instance when Fat Dog teaches him how to bowl, he accidentally calls him "Little Costumed Danny")
 Piranha Mae (voiced by Erin Fitzgerald) – Buddy's best friend.
 Cruddy McFearson (voiced by Brian Drummond) – The bully to Buddy.
 Onion Boy (voiced by Ian James Corlett) – A friend and classmate of Buddy.
 Doctor Rectangle (voiced by Peter Kelamis) – Buddy's Dad.
 Polly-Esther (voiced by Teryl Rothery and Pauline Newstone, respectively) – Buddy's Teacher and Neighbour who is double-faced. Despite having a single body, her two heads are separate in personality and opinions.

Voice cast

 Mark Acheson as Fat Dog Mendoza
 Kathleen Barr as Little Costumed Buddy/Gigantic Robot/Union Leader/Spanish Senorita/A recorded operator/Old Woman Operator/
 Erin Fitzgerald as Piranha Mae/a Woman in line/On-Screen Date
 Brian Drummond as Cruddy McFearson/Pimple faced worker/Ham Sandwich/Shephard
 Norma MacMillan as Mom Rectangle
 Peter Kelamis as Doc Rectangle/Jimmy
 Ian James Corlett as Onion Boy/Agreeable Lad/The Elder/Architect/Turkey/Ranch Hand/Waiter/Eskimo/a Monkey/Tortilla Baby/Veterarian Doc/Yogi/Toad
 Pauline Newstone as Esther
 Teryl Rothery as Polly
 Phil Hayes as Hamperman/Right Sock Puppet/Paco/The Musgrovite/The Elder/Recorded Promo Voice
 French Tickner as Old Grandpappy Buddy
 Paul Dobson as Brett/Brett Sock Puppet/a Brethren/Sal Big Fish/Super Salesman
 Nicole Oliver as Laura Sock Puppet/Brenda/Marry/A female reporter/Robot Baby/An Alien
 Dale Wilson as Power Plus Man/Recorded Message voice/Gladiator Foreman/The Swoosh/Pops/a Man/The Toad
 Garry Chalk as Brutus/a Painter/Interpreter X/
 Don Brown as Ceasar/a Narrator/Henchman
 Long John Baldry as the Golden Volcano God
 Scott McNeil as Bus Driver/Golphing Buddy/Handyman/Old Man/Pee Wee "Chili" Bottoms/Matthews/Lab Guy
 David Kaye as a Spokesperson/Matt/Big Al/A Pterodactyl/An Announcer/P.A./Stan "The Hand" Tubbs
 Terry Klassen as Texas Harry/Mike/Monkey/Old Monkey/Precious/Swarmy Reporter/Pilot/An Ambulance Medic/Mr. Omnipotent/a Man/Ham Man/Young Nerd
 Jay Brazeau as Boss/Gus
 Brent Miller as a Man
 Gerard Plunkett as Nelson
 Chantal Strand as Uncas
 Lee Tockar as Curator/A Triceratops/Car Thief/a Clerk/An Alien/
 Colin Murdock as a T-Rex
 John Payne as Aviminus/Buck Mulligan
 Sam Vincent as Cruddy McPhearson (in one episode)
 Wally Marsh as Professor Quadraped
 Andrea Libman as Mavis
 Jay Brazeau as Old Man X
 Shirley Milliner as Mrs. Big Feet
 Christopher Gaze as Skinny Boyle Esquire
 Cameron Lane as Mr. Johnson
 Jim Byrnes as Dan Fantastic
 Jason Gray-Stanford as Teen Robot Guy
 Michael Dobson as a Host
 Doug Parker as Dave the Dung Beetle/Carl Nussbalm/Patron Arnie/
 Babz Chula as Thelma Fine
 Tabitha St. Germain as Drama Girl/an Operator/Tough Chick/a Woman
 Maxine Miller as Lady Liberty
 Fran Dowie as The Balloonist
 Don McKay as Steamed Man
 Collin Murdoch as Secret Government Man
 Saffron Henderson as Gothic Girl/Cissy Poole

Development
Development for the series began in March 1994, when Sunbow explored producing a show based on the one-shot comic. For many years, it remained on Sunbow's development slate as the studio classified it as a "Raw" property due to it only existing as a one-shot comic.

In December 1997, production for the series started with the completion of the preliminary bible for the series to convert the adult nature of the comic into a kids property, and to retain the qualities of the characters. Sunbow began to ship the show off to other companies as a co-production deal, who were mainly impressed with the Little Costume Buddy character.

In March 1998, Sunbow began to find a European partner for the series, which they found Cartoon Network Europe as broadcaster and TMO-Loonland as co-producer. The former noticing the show could appeal to the European audience, and the latter being that their unique animation style would work for a series like Fat Dog Mendoza. By September, both companies signed in September 1998, with TMO-Loonland's signing allowing the series to fulfill European content requirements. The funding for the series was split for 50% by Sunbow, 35% by TMO-Loonland, and 10%–15% by Cartoon Network Europe. It also allowed Cartoon Network Europe to fulfill their two-production deal with Sunbow, with fellow show The Cramp Twins filling the other half.

By 1999, the production was confirmed for an Early-2000 delivery from Cartoon Network Europe, who would hold first-run rights to the series.

List of episodes

Season 1

Season 2

Television airing
The series originally premiered on Cartoon Network UK in February 2000, and remained on the channel until 2005 (mainly being repeated late-at-night). Channel 5 later acquired free-TV rights and began airing the show in 2001 as part of their The Core teen block, and later transitioned to Milkshake FM.

The show also aired on several other Cartoon Network feeds, including Cartoon Network MENA.

Over the next few years, the show was pre-sold by TV-Loonland to other broadcasters and companies, like Nox Music in Russia, Retelsat in Spain, and ZigZag in Poland.

In Australia, the series aired on Nickelodeon.

The show also re-ran on KidsCo in a small number of countries.
 
The series never aired in the United States.

Home Media
In 2000, home video distributor Maverick announced they had acquired the British home video rights to Sony Wonder's catalogue in the United Kingdom. The company released single VHS volume of the series in October 2000, containing the first three episodes in production order: "Other Side of the Moon", "Forgotten Fat Dog", and "Power Play".

References

External links
Fat Dog Mendoza at retrojunk.com

2000 American television series debuts
2001 American television series endings
1990s American animated television series
2000s American animated television series
American children's animated comedy television series
American children's animated fantasy television series
2000 British television series debuts
2001 British television series endings
1990s British animated television series
2000s British animated television series
British children's animated comedy television series
British children's animated fantasy television series
2000 German television series debuts
2001 German television series endings
1990s German animated television series
German children's animated comedy television series
German children's animated fantasy television series
English-language television shows
Cartoon Network original programming
Television series by Sunbow Entertainment
Television series by Sony Pictures Television
Animated television series about dogs
Fictional popes